Oedipina carablanca, commonly known as the Los Diamantes worm salamander, is a species of salamander in the family Plethodontidae.
It is endemic to Costa Rica and is only known from its type locality, Los Diamantes, near Guápiles, Limón Province.

Its natural habitats are tropical moist lowland forests, plantations, rural gardens, and heavily degraded former forest.
It is threatened by habitat loss.

References 

Oedipina
Endemic fauna of Costa Rica
Amphibians of Costa Rica
Taxonomy articles created by Polbot
Amphibians described in 1968